Tricicle is a humorous gestural theater company of three actors, Joan Gràcia, Paco Mir, and Carles Sans. They founded the company in 1979 to perform brief sketches in the street and at alternative venues.

At that time, the three members of Tricicle were students at Barcelona’s Institut del Teatre and specialized in pantomime and in the dramatic arts. In 1982, following several seasons of performances at alternative venues, they made their debut on the professional circuit at the Sala Villarroel in Barcelona with a show comprising a collection of different sketches created during their time at the so-called cafés-teatro (bars and cafés offering live performances). The show, entitled Manicomic, was both a critical and commercial success and went on to win a prize at Sitges International Theater Festival that year.

History 

In 1982, they got their first professional engagement; a premiere at the Barcelona Theater "Villarroel" of their first production, Manicomic, a collection of some gags they had created over three years. That same year, they received their first professional recognition: a prize at the International Theater Festival of Sitges.

Recognition in Spain 
In 1983, they met "Chicho" Narciso Ibáñez Serrador, which gave them the opportunity to perform a sketch on the game show Un, dos, tres... responda Otra vez (One, two, three ... respond again). They performed a parody of Julio Iglesias' "I'm a crook, I am a gentleman."

In 1984, the show Exit premiered. The show had toured in various Spanish cities and was invited to perform the work in various countries.

Slastic 
In 1986, Tricicle premiered their third work, Slastic: a series of comic situations focusing on the world of sports. The company itself chose this work in November 2004 to celebrate its 25th anniversary.

Later, Tricicle joined with two other companies of Spain, Dagoll Dagom and Append, to found the production company "3xtr3s" (three by three). The new company, in addition to producing shows of the three companies and other groups, won Teatre Victòria, of Barcelona. The first work produced "3xtr3s" at the Victoria Theatre was "Botiga dels horrors" (The Little Shop of Horrors) of Howard Ashman, which received critical acclaim.

Maturity 
In 1992, the show premiered its fourth production: Terrific. That same year, they premiered a second TV series (Festivals) and began preparing the first short film that introduced them to the world of cinema. On August 9, 1992, they performed at the Montjuïc Olympic Stadium as part of the closing ceremony of the Olympic Games in their native city, Barcelona. It was a simple number with reverence and sympathy to the political leaders, including the world's most important, in the stadium. It was the first comic gag performed as part of an Olympic ceremony.

The restless activity of the group and the constant requests that came flooding in from all over the world forced the group to the point that to be able to concentrate on new creative endeavors, they designed a clone of themselves; Tricicle. They created a second company, which would direct themselves, and be responsible for making representations of his works in countries around the world, while they could focus on other things.

Terrrific was followed in 1996 by Entretrés, which represents over three years in various cities.

In 1999, they premiered Tricicle 20, an anthology of some of their gags from their shows which commemorated the company's twentieth anniversary.

In 2002, Tricicle premiered Sit, a collection of comic situations, all involving a chair. In the winter of 2004, it was performed for three months in a theater in Paris.

On November 3, 2004, they celebrated its 25th anniversary in an event that drew more than 15,000 spectators in the Palau Sant Jordi in Barcelona. The event (co-produced with the daily newspaper Sport, which also celebrated its twenty-fifth anniversary), was called "25 + 25", and consisted of a special recreation of their most successful work, Slastic. Some athletes from and based in Spain in the previous 25 years were involved in the production (including Ángel Nieto, Miguel Indurain, Alex Corretja, Sergi Bruguera, Ronaldinho and Hristo Stoichkov), as they volunteered to perform each of the gags. Comedians including Millán Salcedo, Santiago Segura and Pepe Rubianes performed.

As of 2005, Tricicle has made many tours around the world, including China, Tunisia, Portugal, Austria, and Argentina, while continuing to work on many projects. Meanwhile, the second company, Tricicle, is making more performances in places that Tricicle did not perform.

Theatre 
 1982: Manicomic
 1984: Exit
 1986: Slastic
 1992: Terrrific
 1996: Entretres
 1999: Tricicle 20
 2002: Sit
 2007: Garrick
 2012: Bits
 2017: Hits

Film 
 Features :
 1995: Palace
 Shorts :
 1993: Quien mal anda, mal acaba
 1995: David
 1996: Mendigos sin fronteras
 1997: Polvo eres
 2002: Sit (documentary)

Television 
 1987: Tres Estrelles
 1992: Fiestas populares
 1994: Xooof!
 1999: Pecera de BTV
 2000–2003: Dinamita
 2005: Teletipos
 2005: Trilita
 2010: Més Dinamita

Special events 
 1992: Juegos Paralímpicos (Paralympic Games)
 1992: Closing Ceremony of the Barcelona '92 Olympics
 1992: Seville Expo '92
 1993: Special Olympics
 2004: 25 + 25

Awards
 Gold Medal for Merit in Fine Arts, 2009

References

 
 
 

Spanish mimes
Theatre companies in Catalonia